Patriarch Dionysius I may refer to:

 Patriarch Dionysius I Telmaharoyo, head of the Syriac Orthodox Church in 818–845
 Dionysius I of Constantinople, Ecumenical Patriarch in 1466–1471 and 1488–1490